Copper is an American crime drama television series created for BBC America by Tom Fontana and Will Rokos, who serve as executive producers along with Barry Levinson. The series stars Tom Weston-Jones as Kevin "Corky" Corcoran, a New York police officer in the Five Points area, Kyle Schmid as his friend and former commanding officer, the wealthy Robert Morehouse, Ato Essandoh as African-American physician Dr. Matthew Freeman, and Franka Potente as Five Points madam Eva Heissen.  The series is set in the waning days of the Civil War, in the poor, largely Irish areas of the city. A total of 23 episodes aired over two seasons.

Series overview 
{| class="wikitable plainrowheaders" style="text-align: center;"
|-
! scope="col" style="padding: 0 8px;" colspan="2" rowspan="2" | Season
! scope="col" style="padding: 0 8px;" rowspan="2" | Episodes
! scope="col" colspan="2" | Originally aired
|-
! scope="col" style="padding: 0 8px;" | Season premiere
! scope="col" style="padding: 0 8px;" | Season finale
|-
 |scope="row" style="background: #AE1C21;"|
 |1
 |10
 |style="padding: 0 8px;" |
 |style="padding: 0 8px;" |
|-
 |scope="row" style="background: #005E80;"|
 |2
 |13
 |style="padding: 0 8px;" |
 |style="padding: 0 8px;" |
|}

Episodes

Season 1 (2012)

Season 2 (2013)

References

Fiction set in 1864
Fiction set in 1865

Copper